Summer School is an independent horror film created by Minnesota-based production company Random Creatureface Films.

Plot synopsis
Charles runs a website that reviews "the more macabre of the cinema world" and he has stayed up a bit too late trying to catch up on his work ala a horror movie marathon. In his rapid absorption of an endless series of dark delicacies, Charles has emerged the next day, the first day of Summer School in a bit of a mental flux. He is slipping in and out of consciousness, into a realm of sadistic, genre bending nightmares that test his sanity and question his grip on reality.

Police incident
In August 2005, St. Paul, Minnesota, police were called to a local neighborhood to investigate a possible shooting involving a parked car. The car contained “blood” and “brain matter” on the seats, dashboard, and windows. After canvassing the area, the officers discovered the owner of the car, Lance Hendrickson, one of the directors. The blood and bits of brain were fake—the officers were shown the scene from the then in-production film as proof.

Reception
Dread Central calls the film “wildly entertaining”,  saying it has “set a new standard... for all other independent horror films, it is a sterling standard.” Dread Central also reviewed the “Extra Credit” edition DVD, giving even more praise. The two articles give the film a 4.5 out of 5 and the special features a 4 out of 5.
Fatally Yours says it's “wonderfully clever”, “a slice of horror heaven pie”, and “a film by horror fans, for horror fans.”

The film was also nominated for several awards, winning Mike Nelson and Ben Trandem an award for Best Editing in 2007.
 Nominations for Best Editing, Best Director, and Best Movie from B-Movie Film Festival in 2007.
 B-Movie Award for Best Editing from B-Movie Film Festival in 2007.
Nominated for Best Feature Film at Eerie Horror Film Fest in 2006.

References

External links
 
 
 Nightmare 101

2006 horror films
2006 films
2000s monster movies
American independent films
American monster movies
2000s English-language films
2000s American films